Jules S. Bacon (July 8, 1917 – January 13, 2007) was an American professional bodybuilder.

Bacon was born in Philadelphia. He began weight training at age 20 and came second in the 1941 Mr. America bodybuilding contest. He won Mr. America in 1943. He wrote for the magazine Strength & Health and was featured in bodybuilding magazines in the 1940s. He worked for York Barbell. Bacon was a lifelong friend of John Grimek.

Bacon founded the Jules Bacon Health Clubs in York, Pennsylvania. He was inducted into the International Federation of Bodybuilding & Fitness Hall of Fame.

Bacon died in York, Pennsylvania, aged 89.

References

1917 births
2007 deaths
American bodybuilders
American male weightlifters
People associated with physical culture
People from Philadelphia
Professional bodybuilders
20th-century American people
21st-century American people